El Khabar Broadcasting Company, or simply KBC, is an Algerian private television channel, owned by El Khabar Group. It was set up on December 25, 2013, by Ali Djerri, and is headquartered in the city of Algiers.

History
KBC TV was founded on 25 December 2013, it has started to broadcast its programs on 25 December 2013. In May 2014, the Ambassador of the United States in Algeria Henry S. Ensher visited the headquarters of the channel in Algiers.

Programming

News 
 KBC News (2013–)

Current affairs and sports shows

Entertainment and variety shows 
 All Options (2014–)
 
 
 Hip Hop Planet (2014–16)
 No Panic (2014–)
 
 
 
 
 Thai Thai Operation (2014–14)

Television dramas 
 Akel wella Mehboul? (2014–14)
 Douar El Hadj Lakhder (2014–14)
 Mad Men (2017–)

Anime 
 Dragon Ball Super (2017–)
 Eyeshield 21 (2017)
 Hunter x Hunter (2017–)
 One Piece (2016)
 The Mysterious Cities of Gold (2017–)

Animated series 
 Shaun the Sheep (2017)
 Transformers: Prime (2017–)

Directors 
 chief executive officer
 Zahreddine Smati
 Directors-general
 2013–2016: Ali Djerri
 2016–current: Mehdi Ben Aissa

References

External links
  
 KBC on Facebook 

Arab mass media
Television in Algeria
Arabic-language television stations
Arabic-language television
Television channels and stations established in 2013
Television stations in Algeria
2013 establishments in Algeria